Golo may refer to:

Places
 Golo (river), Corsica, France
 Golo (department), a former department of France on Corsica
 Golo Island, a part of the municipality of Looc, Occidental Mindoro, Philippines
 Golo, Ig, a settlement in the municipality of Ig, Slovenia
 Golo, Vodice, a former settlement in the municipality of Vodice, Slovenia
 Golo, Sudan, a town in Darfur
 Golo, Kentucky, an unincorporated community, United States

People
 Golo (footballer), Spanish retired footballer Óscar Santor Martínez (born 1978)
 Golo Mann (1909–1994), German historian and writer born Angelus Mann, son of Thomas Mann

Other uses
 Golo Footwear, an American shoe manufacturer
 Golo (programming language)
 Golo, who falsely claimed to be the lover of Genevieve of Brabant of medieval legend

See also
 Gollo people, an ethnic group in Western Bahr el Ghazal, Sudan

